A baby bumper headguard cap, also known as a falling cap, or pudding hat, is a protective hat worn by children learning to walk, to protect their heads in case of falls.

Known as a pudding or black pudding, a version used during the early 17th century until the late 18th century was usually open at the top and featured a sausage-shaped bumper roll that circled the head like a crown. It was fastened with straps under the chin.

The modern-day version can be many colors and may cover the entire head like a helmet.

References

External links

 Pudding hat at the V&A Museum of Childhood
kid Maintenance

Children's clothing
Helmets
Hats